Olfides Sáez Vera (born 24 September 1994) is a Cuban weightlifter. In 2020, he won the gold medal in the men's 89kg event at the Roma 2020 World Cup in Rome, Italy. He is also a three-time medalist at the Pan American Weightlifting Championships.

He represented Cuba at the 2020 Summer Olympics in Tokyo, Japan. He finished in 9th place in the men's 96 kg event.

References

External links 
 

Living people
1994 births
Cuban male weightlifters
Weightlifters at the 2019 Pan American Games
Pan American Games competitors for Cuba
Pan American Weightlifting Championships medalists
Weightlifters at the 2020 Summer Olympics
Olympic weightlifters of Cuba
People from Abreus, Cuba
20th-century Cuban people
21st-century Cuban people